"¿A quién le importa?" (English: literally, "To whom does it matter?"; idiomatically, "Who cares?") is a single released from the Spanish pop rock band Alaska y Dinarama's 1986 No es pecado album. Fangoria – composed of two of the song's three original artists, Alaska and Nacho Canut – recorded an updated, more electronic version of the song along with a new music video. The song was featured in the "Astracanada" disc of the album. Other cover versions include those by Pink Punk and Christina Rapado.

Composition and themes

The song was originally written and produced by Carlos Berlanga and Nacho Canut. 

The song describes a person who is criticized for being different. The question and title lyric "Who cares?" is repeated throughout the song indicating that criticism does not affect her and she will stay the way she is. The chorus of the song asks (translated from the Spanish): "Who cares what I do? / Who cares what I say? / I am the way I am. I'll keep on being that. / I will never change."

Alaska y Dinarama's version of the song was later used as a gay anthem by the Spanish language-speaking LGBT community.

Track listing
"Alaska y Dinarama Spanish Single"

 ¿A quién le importa ?
 ¿A quién le importa? (Club mix)

Music videos

Alaska y Dinarama's music video

The music video was filmed in 1986 on TVE's soundstage for Alaska's program La Bola de Cristal. The music video depicts Alaska with her "Rastafari Punk" look (her makeup is green, and her hair is shaved from the sides and is grabbed into a high pony tail with dreadlocks), as she sings at the center of an energetic crowd (whom seem to get motivated by her and support her). In this video Alaska is wearing a silver fringe jacket. This style later inspired Thalia to dress up almost identically to her during her trip to Argentina. This video was first aired in Spain in 1986.

Fangoria's music video

Fangoria's was shot at Benidorm, Spain. The video is basically a theater play, starring Alaska using 5 different sets of clothing. A group compose of 28 energetic people dancing in the "play." This video is a tribute to the end of the year TV programs

Thalía version

In 2002 Latin Mexican pop singer Thalía covered the song in her 2002 self-titled studio album, with an accompanying music video. The music video for the song was shot in black and white and directed by Jeb Brien and shot in Manhattan, New York City, in the "Frying Pan" ship. In the video, Thalía has a punk look, and performs her song in a gay club. Miri Ben-Ari, who plays the violin in the song, also makes a cameo in the video. Amanda Lepore also makes an appearance. The video was first aired in the fall of 2002. In December 2003, Thalía was invited to the Jingle Ball along with other artists such as Jennifer Lopez, Britney Spears, Kelly Clarkson, Beyonce, Sean Paul, and Simple Plan and where she was the first of nine artists to sing where she performed the song along with her hits Dance Dance (The Mexican), I Want You, and Baby, I'm in Love. Thalía also performed the song at the 2003 Latin Grammy Awards where she was nominated for Best Female Pop Vocal Album.

Track listings

Mexican & U.S. CD single

"¿A Quién le Importa?" [Album Version] – 3:44
"¿A Quién le Importa?" [Hex Hector/Mac Quayle Radio Vocal Mix] – 3:58
"¿A Quién le Importa?" [Hex Hector/Mac Quayle Club Vocal Mix] – 7:14
"You Spin Me 'Round (Like a Record)" – 3:56

Promo CD Single
"¿A Quién le Importa?" [Album Version]
"¿A Quién le Importa?" [Hex Hector/Mac Quayle Radio Vocal Mix] – 3:58
"¿A Quién le Importa?" [Hex Hector/Mac Quayle Club Vocal Mix] – 7:14

European Single
"¿A Quién le Importa?" [Hex Hector/Mac Quayle Club Vocal Mix] – 7:14

U.S. 12" vinyl single
A-side
"¿A Quién le Importa?" [Hex Hector/Mac Quayle Club Vocal Mix] – 7:14
"¿A Quién le Importa?" [Hex Hector/Mac Quayle Radio Vocal Mix] – 3:58
B-side
"You Spin Me 'Round (Like a Record)" – 3:56
"¿A Quién le Importa?" [Album Version] – 3:44

In popular culture 
The song was used in important scenes in four Spanish-language Netflix productions between 2018 and 2021. The first was in the Mexican dark comedy The House of Flowers, performed by the character Julián as he comes out both in a recital and in a fantasy cabaret sequence. The second was in the Spanish romcom Despite Everything, where it is performed by the four sisters as they start smoking marijuana in the car at the outset of a road trip to find their fathers, and the third in the Mexican film Ready to Mingle, where it is danced and sung to at the end to show that main character Ana has learned an important lesson about herself and the single ladies have all come to acceptance. The song was also used in the Mexican Spanish television series Rubí as the main theme song; it is sung by Thalia's niece, Camila Sodi, who also starred in the series. In the last episode of the second season of El juego de las llaves, the song was used for the final scene.

Charts

Weekly charts

Year-end charts

References

Thalía songs
1986 songs
2003 singles
Number-one singles in Spain
Spanish-language songs
LGBT-related songs
EMI Latin singles